Manti or Manty may refer to:

Places
 Manti, Iowa, a defunct Mormon settlement
 Manti, Utah, a city, named for the city of Manti in the Book of Mormon
 Manti National Forest, formerly Manti Forest Reserve, in Colorado and Utah
 Manti (crater), on Mars
City of Manti, the chief city in land of Manti, in the Book of Mormon
Hill of Manti, near city of Zarahemla, in the Book of Mormon
Land of Manti, most southerly land of the Nephites, in the Book of Mormon

People
 Manti Te'o (born 1991), American football player
 Harri Mänty (born 1971), Swedish guitarist

Other uses
 Manti (food), a dumpling eaten by the Turkic peoples
 Manti Utah Temple, a Mormon temple in Manti, Utah
 Manti High School, Manti, Utah
 Manti (Book of Mormon), a Nephite soldier in the Book of Mormon
 Mänti, a constructed language created by Daniel Tammet (born 1979)
 Manty, a margarine brand - see BRF S.A.

See also
 Manties, in fiction the residents of the Star Kingdom, later Empire, of Manticore in the Honor Harrington series - see Honorverse